Ugo Mulas (28 August 1928 – 2 March 1973) was an Italian photographer noted for his portraits of artists and his street photography.

Life and work
Mulas began his studies in law in 1948 in Milan, but left to take art courses at the Brera Fine Arts Academy. In 1954 he was asked to cover the Venice Biennale, his first professional assignment. He went on to photograph every Venice Biennale through 1972 and to document his work in an art book.

Mulas worked for a number of Italian magazines and did commercial work for advertising campaigns including clients such as Pirelli and Olivetti. In 1959 in Florence, he discovered Veruschka who later became a well-known model and artist. While covering the Spoleto Festival in 1962, he befriended sculptor Alexander Calder, who later became a major subject of Mulas' photography and writings.

While photographing the 1964 Venice Biennale, Mulas met several American artists, art critics, and the art dealer Leo Castelli. This meeting led to his travel to New York City and his documentation of the Pop art scene. This trip to New York and Mulas' resulting book and exhibits, New York, the New Art Scene became his best known work. The exhibit included enlargements of Mulas' contact sheets and environmental portraits of Robert Rauschenberg, Jasper Johns, Barnett Newman and Roy Lichtenstein.

Mulas died in Milan following several years of serious illness.

Legacy 
 The indie band, Spoon chose Mulas' 1963 portrait of American sculptor Lee Bontecou for their 2007 CD, Ga Ga Ga Ga Ga.

References

General references
 Ugo Mulas. By Germano Celant. Federico Motta Editore, 1993. .

Publications 
 New York; the new art scene. Holt, Rinehart and Winston, 1967.
 David Smith in Italy. By David Smith and Mulas, Charta, 1997. .
 Vent'anni di Biennale, 1954-1972. Mondadori, 1988. .
 Calder. By Mulas and H. Harvard Arnason, Studio, 1971. .
Calder. By Mulas, Milan: Officina Libraria, 2008. .

External links
 Mulas' website

Portrait photographers
Photographers from Milan
1928 births
1973 deaths
Brera Academy alumni